The Savoy Hotel is a luxury hotel located in central London, England.

Savoy Hotel, Hotel Savoy or similar may also refer to:

Hotels 
Brighton Savoy Hotel, Australia
Savoy Homann Bidakara Hotel, Indonesia
Savoy Hotel, Copenhagen, Denmark
Savoy Hotel, Perth, Australia
Savoy Hotel, Malmö, Sweden
Savoy Hotel, Mussoorie, India
 Savoy Hotel, Moscow, Russia

Savoy Hotel and Grill, Kansas City, United States
Savoy-Plaza Hotel, New York City, United States

Other 
 Hotel Savoy (novel), a novel by Joseph Roth
 Savoy Hotel 217, a 1936 German drama film
 Savoy Hotel attack, Israel (1975)

See also 
 Savoy (disambiguation)